Răchitova may refer to:

 Răchitova, a commune in Hunedoara County, Romania
 Răchitova, a village in Oravița town, Caraș-Severin County, Romania
 Răchitova (river), a tributary of the Râul Galben in Romania

See also 
 Răchita (disambiguation)
 Răchiți
 Răchitiș (disambiguation)
 Răchițele (disambiguation)
 Răchitoasa (disambiguation)